Vitos is one of seven parishes (administrative divisions) in the municipality of Grandas de Salime, within the province and autonomous community of Asturias, in northern Spain. 

The population is 20 (INE 2006).

Villages and hamlets
Brualla
Magadán
Puente de Vitos (A Ponte de Vitos)
Vitos

References

Parishes in Grandas de Salime